"Lecture #1" is a mixtape released by English rapper Professor Green via his original record label, The Beats. The Mixtape was released on March 18, 2006, long before his mainstream breakthrough with Alive Till I'm Dead. The Mixtape features guest vocals from the likes of Nyomi Gray, Loudmouth, Skinnyman and Chynaman. Three singles were released from the Mixtape: "Before I Die", "Stereotypical Man" and the double A-side of "Hard Night Out" and "Upper Clapton Dance". "Upper Clapton Dance" later went on to be included as a bonus track on Green's second official studio album, At Your Inconvenience.

Track listing

Singles

Before I Die
 12" vinyl
 "Before I Die" - Album Version
 "Before I Die" - MC Remix Version featuring Plan B, Example, Ghetts and Big Narstie
 "Before I Die" - Radio Friendly Version w/out Intro
 "Before I Die" - Acapella
 "Before I Die" - Instrumental

 CD single
 "Before I Die" - Radio Friendly Version w/Intro
 "Before I Die" - Rude Edit
 "Before I Die" - MC Remix Version featuring Plan B, Example, Ghetts and Big Narstie

Stereotypical Man
 12" vinyl
 "Stereotypical Man" - Dirty Version
 "Stereotypical Man" - Ad Lib Version
 "Stereotypical Man" - Instrumental
 "Stereotypical Man" - Clean Version

 CD single
 "Stereotypical Man"
 "Runnin' to the Exit"
 "Before I Die" - Acapella
 "Same Old Me"

Upper Clapton Dance
 CD single
 "Hard Night Out"
 "Upper Clapton Dance"

References

2006 mixtape albums
Professor Green albums